Camp Sears was a United States Army base located less than two miles (3 km) outside the city of Uijongbu, approximately  north of Seoul. The  installation housed military personnel assigned to the Headquarters Battery of 5-5 ADA (Air Defense Artillery) composed mostly of combat support troops. The installation was home to a single combat arms platoon of air defense scouts known as EWSO (Early Warning System Operator), which provided early warning air defense for the 2nd Infantry Division.

Camp Sears was closed along with several other camps in South Korea as part of a downsizing of forces. The land was returned to the South Korean government.

See also 
 List of United States Army installations in South Korea

References

External links 
 2nd Infantry Division Homepage
 Official US Forces Korea Homepage

Buildings and structures in Gyeonggi Province
Sears
Sears, Camp